Ndava may refer to several settlements in Burundi:

Ndava, Bubanza
Ndava, Bururi	
Ndava, Cibitoke
Ndava, Gitega
Ndava, Muramviya